Dream 2: Middleweight Grand Prix 2008 1st Round was a mixed martial arts event promoted by Dream. It took place on Tuesday, April 29, 2008 at the Saitama Super Arena in Saitama City, Japan. 

The event hosted the opening round of the promotion's Middleweight Grand Prix. All bouts were conducted under Dream Rules, (first round is 10 minutes, second round is 5 minutes) in an  weight class. The evening's Main Event featured Kazushi Sakuraba of Japan and Brazilian kyokushin karateka Andrews Nakahara. It attracted a crowd of 21,397 and was broadcast live across Japan on the SkyPerfect pay-per-view.

The Middleweight champion was determined in Dream 6.

Results

2008 Middleweight Grand Prix opening round

Replacement = **
-->

Notes

 The 8th Opening Round match was held between Katsuyori Shibata and Jason "Mayhem" Miller at Dream 3. The match between Melvin Manhoef and Ralek Gracie was rumored as the 8th match, however, only Manhoef participated in the Grand Prix reserve bout against Dae Won Kim at Dream 3.  
 Originally, a bout between Frank Trigg and Ronaldo Souza was scheduled, however Trigg cited a breakdown in communication between him and Dream officials, which led to the bout being canceled.
 Andrews Nakahara and Ian Murphy made their mixed martial arts debut at this event.
 Yoshihiro Akiyama was scheduled to participate at the event, however he had to withdraw due to injuries suffered during his bout with Kazuo Misaki at Yarennoka!
 Kiyoshi Tamura dropped out of the quarter-finals citing a broken hand from his bout with Masakatsu Funaki. Many believe though the real reason was his reluctance to fight Kazushi Sakuraba, his old wrestling mentor and competitor.

See also 
 Dream (mixed martial arts)
 List of Dream champions
 2008 in DREAM

References

Dream (mixed martial arts) events
2008 in mixed martial arts
Mixed martial arts in Japan
Sport in Saitama (city)
2008 in Japan